St. John's Lutheran Church, also known as St. John's German Evangelical Church of Walhalla, is a historic church at 301 W. Main Street in Walhalla, South Carolina.
There is a preschool run by the church <ref>.

History
The church was built by The German Evangelical Lutheran Congregation due to the nearest church being unduly far for many Walhalla residents <ref>. It was planned in 1858, the same year the congregation voted to allow sermons to be held in English, with the ground being cleared in early 1859 and construction finished in 1861. The civil war soon lead to issues with the church's management, as much of the congregation fought in the Confederate Army. Once they came back, the church faced financial issues due to the prevalence of Confederate notes and other useless forms of paper money in the treasury, though this improved through slight ways. In the later 1860s, a bell was added to the church and kerosene lights replaced candles. Eventually, the bell came out of use, presumably before the replacement of the Town Clock and its pairing bell in 1888. This bell is still in use, shaking the building when it sounds. The original plain glass windows were replaced with stained glass in 1910. Until the 1960s, a major source of lighting for the church was a chandelier, now in the foyer of the parish house. The modern Parish House, Church Office, and Fellowship Hall were built from 1969-1971. The Sunday School Building was renovated in 1973-4. In 1980, it was added to the National Register of Historic Places<ref>.

References

Who We Are. (n.d.). St. Johns Evangelical Lutheran Church Walhalla, SC. Retrieved February 4, 2023, from https://www.stjohnswalhalla.org/who-we-are/

Edgefield Advertiser. June 23, 1858.

Shealy, George B. (1990). Walhalla: A German Settlement in Upstate South Carolina (pp. 78–79). Blueridge Art Association.

External links

German-American history
German-American culture in South Carolina
Lutheran churches in South Carolina
Churches on the National Register of Historic Places in South Carolina
Churches completed in 1859
19th-century Lutheran churches in the United States
National Register of Historic Places in Oconee County, South Carolina
Churches in Oconee County, South Carolina